Northeast Agricultural University (NEAU) was established in 1948 in Harbin, Heilongjiang Province, People's Republic of China.

It is a Chinese state Double First Class University Plan university, identified by the Ministry of Education. NEAU is located in Heilongjiang Province and is one of the Project 211 universities in China.

Academics
There are 19 colleges and one educational academy in NEAU. Disciplines such as Agronomy, Engineering, Science, Management, Economics, Education, Arts and Law are supported in NEAU. There are 3 national key disciplines, 2 key disciplines in the Agriculture Department, 18 provincial level key disciplines, and 6 postdoctoral programs covering 32 doctoral directions, 65 master programs, and 66 undergraduate programs.

The State Soybean Engineering Research Center, a laboratory of the Ministry of Agriculture, and a key laboratory of the Ministry of Education for dairy science are located on the campus.

In NEAU, there are 1006 faculty and staff members, including 312 professors and 452 associate professors. There are 2 academicians of the Chinese Academy of Engineering Science with one specially appointed professor of the Changjiang Scholars Program. Currently NEAU consists of 28,052 students, including 24,157 undergraduates and 3690 graduate students.

The university has established links with over 40 universities and research institutes from the United States, Japan, Russia, etc. There are 124 foreign students in NEAU. It has been progressively forming international contacts mainly with northeast Asia and has become a hub for knowledge exchange in agriculture education and science and technology with countries in northeast Asia.

References

External links
Northeast Agricultural University Official Website
Real 3D map

Universities and colleges in Heilongjiang
Universities and colleges in Harbin
Educational institutions established in 1948
1948 establishments in China